Dooler is a surname. Notable people with the surname include:

Carl Dooler (1943–2010), English rugby league footballer 
Steve Dooler, English rugby league footballer

See also
Dooher
Dooley